The Call is a music variety game show, originally airing on Mnet and simulcast on tvN each Friday night, starting from May 4, 2018.

The show was created by South Korean television producer Lee Seon-young, who also created I Can See Your Voice, and 
focuses on getting Korean artists from various genres to collaborate in producing a new song.

The last episode of season 1 was aired on June 29, 2018, with a special episode airing on July 6, 2018.

Season 2 is airing starting from July 5, 2019.

Season 1

Cast
MCs
Lee Sang-min
Yoo Se-yoon

1st line up
Shin Seung-hun
Kim Jong-kook (Turbo)
Kim Bum-soo
Wheesung

2nd line up
Hwang Chi-yeul
Taeil (Block B)
Ailee
Bewhy
Kim Chung-ha 

3rd line up
Hwanhee
Gummy
 
Crush

4th line up
Jung-in
Taemin (Shinee)
Loco & Gray
Suran
Eddy Kim

Groups
In the "Love Call" at the project's beginning, a new group is formed if there is a "two-way call" between an initial group and an additional singer. After this part,
- If there is still an unestablished group (because of "one-way call" or "no call" between them), they will be forced to become a new group with the remaining additional singer.
- If there are still more than two groups, they have to re-group with the remaining additional singers in the "Last Call" just after that, with the same method as the "Love Call".
After the collaborative stages, the audiences will pick a team as "Best Couple" based on their performance. The audiences will also pick a "Team You Want to See Again" (only appeared in the first project) which will directly become a new group for the next project without having to participate in the "Last Call". Other singers have to participate in the "Last Call" to form the new groups for the next project. 
 – Best Couple (picked by the audiences)

Projects

Season 2

Cast
MCs
Yoon Jong-shin
Yoon Min-soo (Vibe)

Soyou
Kim Jong-kook (match-maker)
1st line up
Tiger JK & Bizzy
Noel
Cheetah
N.Flying
2nd line up
Ha Dong-kyun
Lyn
Hwang Chi-yeul
Kim Feel
DinDin
3rd line up

Yubin
Hangzoo (Rhythm Power)
Hui (Pentagon)

Final line up
Song Ga-in
Baekho (NU'EST)
Parc Jae-jung

Ratings
In the table below,  represent the lowest ratings and  represent the highest ratings.

Season 1

Season 2

References

External links
 (Season 1) on Mnet 
 (Season 2) on Mnet 

2018 South Korean television series debuts
2019 South Korean television series endings
South Korean music television shows
Mnet (TV channel) original programming
Korean-language television shows